The William Gray Warden House (also known as the Warden House) is a historic home in Palm Beach, Florida. It is located at 112 Seminole Avenue. On August 1, 1984, it was added to the U.S. National Register of Historic Places.

The residence was designed by renowned architect Addison Mizner in 1922, in the Mediterranean Revival-Spanish Colonial Revival styles.

References

External links

 Palm Beach County listings at National Register of Historic Places
 Palm Beach County listings at Florida's Office of Cultural and Historical Programs

Houses in Palm Beach County, Florida
Palm Beach, Florida
Houses on the National Register of Historic Places in Florida
National Register of Historic Places in Palm Beach County, Florida
Mediterranean Revival architecture in Florida
Spanish Colonial Revival architecture in Florida
Addison Mizner buildings